The 2004–05 Top League was the second season of Japan's domestic rugby union competition, the Top League. Toshiba Brave Lupus won both the league round-robin and the Microsoft Cup knockout competitions.

Teams

Top League season

Final standings

Fixtures and results

Microsoft Cup play-offs
The top eight teams in the league played off for the Microsoft Cup (2005) knock out tournament, which was won by Toshiba Brave Lupus.

Quarter-finals

Semi-finals

The number of tries and goals being equal, the result was decided in favour of Yamaha by a lottery held at Hanazono after the game.

Final

In the season Toshiba Brave Lupus were top of the Top League, and Yamaha were second.

Top League Challenge Series

Fukuoka Sanix Bombs and Secom Rugguts won promotion to the 2005–06 Top League via the 2005 Top League Challenge Series, while Honda Heat and Toyota Industries Shuttles progressed to the promotion play-offs.

Promotion and relegation play-offs
Two promotion/relegation matches (Irekaesen) were played with the winners qualifying for the 2005–06 Top League. The 10th-placed team from the Top League against the 3rd-placed team from Challenge 1. The 9th-placed team from the Top League against the 1st-placed team from Challenge 2.

So Ricoh and World stayed in the Top League for the 2005–06 season.

References

External links

Top League
Top League
Japan Rugby League One
Top